Machado is a surname of Portuguese origin meaning the word "axe" or "hatchet" dating back to approximately 2nd century Europe. It is commonly found in Portugal,  Spain, Brazil and Latin America, and India (Southern Tamil Nadu and Southern Kerala) due to the Portuguese and Spanish colonization during the age of discovery. It can also be found in Macao, China and several former Portuguese territories in Africa. Machado meaning axe. In Aramaic Makkaba and Modern Hebrew Makebet – also spelled Machabees – it is the surname of Judas Machabee, that was later extended to all the descendants of Matityahu ben Yoḥanan HaKohen, head of the Hasmonean family, who had five sons. The Jewish Encyclopedia records five hatchets in the Coat of Arms for the Machado surname. In Italy, the surname may be associated with Jewish heritage, particularly in Genova; Jews are attested in Genova since Roman times, and the surname is one of the most frequent found in documents from Genova’s Synagogue. The Machados in India were populated after the conversion of Paravar race of Tuticorin (District of Tamil Nadu in India) to Catholicism by the Portuguese in the year 1532, a few years after they began trading in India.

The word machado means axe in Portuguese.

People
Notable people with the surname include:

Arts and entertainment
Antonio Machado (1875–1939), Spanish poet
Carmen Maria Machado (born 1986), American writer
Celso Machado (born 1953), Brazilian musician and composer
China Machado (1929–2016), fashion model, editor, television producer
Cristian Machado (born 1974), Brazilian heavy metal singer
Joaquim Maria Machado de Assis (1839–1908), Brazilian writer
Justina Machado (born 1972), United States actress
Larissa Machado (born 1933), Brazilian singer-songwriter, actress and dancer 
Manuel Machado (1874–1947), Spanish writer

Politics
Bernardino Machado (1851–1944), Portuguese statesman
Gerardo Machado (1869–1939), Cuban independence hero and politician 
Gustavo Machado (1898–1983), Venezuelan politician
Luis Alberto Machado (1932–2016), Venezuelan Minister of Intelligence 
María Corina Machado (born 1967), Venezuelan politician
Joaquim Germano Pinto Machado Correia da Silva, Portuguese Governor of Macau

Sports
Anderson Machado (born 1981), United States baseball player
Andrés Machado (born 1993), Venezuelan baseball player
Djair Baptista Machado (born 1976), Brazilian footballer
Félix Machado (born 1972), Venezuelan boxer
Honorio Machado (born 1982), Venezuelan racing cyclist
Israel Machado (born 1960), Brazilian basketball player
J. P. Machado (born 1976), American football player
Julio Machado (born 1965), Venezuelan baseball player
Leandro Machado, Brazilian footballer
Leandro Ruiz Machado (born 1976), Brazilian water polo player
Manny Machado (born 1992), United States baseball player
Manuela Machado (born 1963), Portuguese long-distance runner
Marcelo Machado (born 1975), Brazilian basketball player
Octávio Machado (born 1949), Portuguese footballer and coach
Paulo Machado (born 1986), Portuguese footballer
Rob Machado (born 1973), United States surfer
Robert Machado (born 1973), Venezuelan baseball player
Roseli Machado (1968–2021), Brazilian long-distance runner
Rui Machado (born 1984), Portuguese tennis player
 Scott Machado (born 1990), basketball player in the Israeli Basketball Premier League
Teresa Machado (1969–2020), Portuguese Olympic athlete
Tiago Machado (born 1985), Portuguese road racing cyclist
Valesca Machado, Brazilian mixed martial artist
The Machado brothers, Brazilian jiu-jitsu teachers and competitors
Rigan Machado (born 1966)
Carlos Machado (born 1963)
Jean Jacques Machado (born 1968)

Others
Alicia Machado (born 1976), Venezuelan Miss Universe
John Machado, California art entrepreneur and historian
Mario Machado (born 1935), television and radio broadcaster and actor
Priscila Machado (born 1986), Miss Brazil 2011
Rod Machado (born 1953), United States pilot
Tina Machado (born 1960), American businesswoman and Miss Hawaii USA 1985
Peter Machado (born 1954), Archbishop of Archdiocese of Bangalore,India

Places
Machado, Minas Gerais, a city in Brazil
Machado, California, a former town in California

References

Spanish-language surnames
Portuguese-language surnames